Stock Aitken Waterman (abbreviated as SAW) are an English songwriting and record production trio consisting of Mike Stock, Matt Aitken, and Pete Waterman. The trio had great success from the mid-1980s through the early 1990s. SAW is considered one of the most successful songwriting and producing partnerships of all time, scoring more than 100 UK top 40 hits, selling 40 million records and earning an estimated £60 million (about $104 million).

SAW started producing underground club hits, but earned worldwide success with a mix of hi-NRG-influenced sound, romantic Motown lyrics and Italo disco melodies. During 1984–1989, their musical style was labelled Eurobeat. They also put swing shuffle elements into their songs.

History

The team
In January 1984, Mike Stock and Matt Aitken called Pete Waterman asking for a meeting. Mike and Matt turned up with a song they had written and produced called "The Upstroke", a hi-NRG female version of Frankie Goes to Hollywood's "Relax". Pete Waterman was impressed and offered to form a partnership with Mike and Matt. "The Upstroke", performed by female duo Agents Aren't Aeroplanes, was the very first Stock Aitken Waterman record. It wasn't a chart hit, but it was a club hit and was championed by Radio 1's John Peel. Their initial style was in creating hi-NRG dance music with "You Think You're a Man" by Divine (UK No. 16 in July 1984) and "Whatever I Do" by Hazell Dean (UK No. 4 in July 1984). This period saw a rapid refining of the core production team and their roles, with a fourth collaborator, Pete Ware, who was co-credited on the team's earliest records, leaving after Stock and Aitken objected to him taking a side gig touring with Dean.

The production trio achieved their first UK No. 1 single in March 1985 with "You Spin Me Round (Like a Record)" by Dead or Alive. Although a massive commercial success, the record set the scene for SAW's often fractious creative relationship with those bands and artists who demanded creative involvement in their records. Engineer Phil Harding, who mixed the track, said tensions were running so high between the band members and producers Stock and Aitken during mixing, that it almost escalated to violence. Stock has disputed the seriousness of studio tensions, alleging that singer Pete Burns, Harding and Waterman have all "exaggerated" what happened in their recounting of events. Despite the enormous success of the single, Pete Waterman has stated in interviews that the trio were still in dire financial straits at the time.

This chart success and the trio's sound attracted the attention of girl group Bananarama. Group member Siobhan Fahey wanted to record a cover version of Shocking Blue's hit song "Venus". The result was a pop/hi-NRG reworking which became a worldwide chart hit, reaching No. 1 on the U.S. Billboard Hot 100 chart on 6 September 1986, and reaching the top 10 in the UK and many other countries. Bananarama went on to make Stock, Aitken and Waterman their main producers, and would collaborate with them on some of their biggest hits, including "Love in the First Degree", "I Can't Help It", and "I Heard a Rumour". The act were one of only a few who were given co-writing credits with the producers, with Stock describing the creative relationship as challenging; explaining he was obliged to collaborate with them due to a deal with their management. “It’s very difficult to be creative if someone’s just going to mock you, or laugh at you,” he said. “With Bananarama it was just awkward, all the time very awkward, and I didn’t feel comfortable writing with them.”

SAW took early notice of the skills of UK engineer, remixer and producer Harding and made him the chief engineer and remixer at the newly formed PWL studios. Harding was another significant force in shaping the sound of a PWL record, and subsequent engineers Pete Hammond and Dave Ford would follow his example. Harding and co-producer/keyboard player Ian Curnow became the club remix and production "B team" of PWL Studios with many remixes and productions for internal PWL SAW Productions (Kylie Minogue, Bananarama, Dead Or Alive, Mel & Kim) as well as external record company clients (e.g. Diana Ross, Michael Jackson/Jackson 5, Holly Johnson, Pet Shop Boys, Eighth Wonder, Four Tops, Chic, Depeche Mode, Erasure, Jesus Jones, Voice of the Beehive, Gary Moore) which included many U.S. dance chart No. 1s (such as ABC's "When Smokey Sings", Imagination's "Instinctual", Blue Mercedes' "I Want to Be Your Property"). They also produced the Princess hit "Say I'm Your Number One" (1985), the Mandy hit "I Just Can't Wait" (1987), and Sinitta's "Toy Boy" (1987).

The assembly line
Following their early success, their style evolved into a more mainstream synthpop, typically performed by attractive singers. Their usual method for creating the music was to write the songs themselves, although some of their early artists (such as Dead or Alive and Bananarama) wrote or cowrote their own material. Next they would record the music with extensive use of synthesizers, drum machines (drums were often credited to "A Linn", a reference to the Linn brand of drum machine) and sequencers; and then finally bring in a singer solely to record the vocal track. Pete Burns of Dead or Alive would later criticise SAW for their methods, describing that "they took our sound and just basically wheeled it off with a load of other imbeciles, and that makes me a bit sour."

The tendency toward interchanging artists and repertoire was well established when Rick Astley's breakout album Whenever You Need Somebody got its name and title track from a minor hit the trio had produced a year earlier for O'Chi Brown. Evidently they thought the song still had some mileage, and it was even issued with an exact replica of O'chi's club mix for the Rick Astley club mix. Similarly, many of their songs were tried out and recorded by multiple artists; Mel and Kim, Pepsi and Shirlie and Sinitta all recorded the song "Who's Gonna Catch You", both Kylie Minogue and Mandy Smith recorded "Got To Be Certain", whilst Mel and Kim, Carol Hitchcock and Hazell Dean all laid down vocals for "More Than Words Can Say". Their prodigious, production line-like output and similar song structures led to them being referred to as the "hit factory" (not to be confused with the record label of the same name or the New York City recording studio The Hit Factory) and attracted criticism from many quarters, including the Guardian newspaper who unflatteringly dubbed the team, "Schlock, Aimless and Waterdown". However, Pete Waterman defended their style by comparing it to the output of Motown in the 1960s.

SAW's early work was recorded and mixed at Marquee Studios in Wardour Street, where Phil Harding and Rob Waldron worked with them on Youthquake, the Dead or Alive album which included their huge hit "You Spin Me Round (Like a Record)". Waldron went to work as an assistant engineer to Harding when Waterman opened his new studio in Borough, London (The Hit Factory). Waldron became the chief recording engineer and Linn 9000 programmer (A Linn) and Harding was the mixer/remixer, working with various artists including Bananarama, Princess, Rick Astley, Hazell Dean, Haywoode, Brilliant and O'chi Brown.

The youth, the press and the underground
SAW's greatest success was in fully exploiting the underground music scene that was booming in Britain in the late 1980s. SAW's goal was to harness the dynamic energy of club culture (and the sound of Hi-NRG music) and bring it to a mainstream audience. In this regard, they were extremely similar to Motown, with SAW reportedly making use of the "artist development deal" just as Berry Gordy had two decades earlier. Under such arrangements, all facets of a young artist's career would be controlled and dictated by the record company, and often the artist's publishing rights would be co-opted in the process and the record company would fill the role of manager on the artist's behalf.

While SAW seem to have worked equally well with artists under their control and with those more established and independent acts, it obviously made more business sense for them to focus on the development of new talent under the terms that gave them the most control. As the 1990s rolled in, they increasingly focused on their young teenage signings (through PWL and the publishing arm of All Boys Music).

PWL was championed by the music papers for their fresh sound and seemingly underground aesthetic, but not for long. They incurred bad reviews from the British music press establishment when they strong-armed the group M/A/R/R/S into a legal settlement; M/A/R/R/S had taken from SAW's own recording, "Roadblock", and used in their surprise hit "Pump Up the Volume". Pete Waterman wrote an open letter to the music press calling such things "wholesale theft". The press fired back that Waterman was currently using the bassline of Colonel Abrams's "Trapped" in Rick Astley's "Never Gonna Give You Up". Indeed, "Roadblock" itself could be described as inspired by the classic Average White Band hit "Pick Up the Pieces". Waterman's production company later lifted the entire basic rhythm arrangement from "Pump Up the Volume" (complete with the chorus) in a remix for a Sybil record (wisely titled the "Red Ink Remix"). As a result, relations between PWL and much of the UK's music underground were for a long time acrimonious. Waterman said it was a matter of principle rather than profit and promised to donate all royalties from the court case to charity.

As the epitome of creating very popular teen-pop music, the trio were often satirised or criticised. Comedy group Morris Minor and the Majors' parodied the Stock Aitken Waterman style on "This is the Chorus", specifically referencing Kylie Minogue's hit song "I Should Be So Lucky" as well as Mel and Kim's "Respectable". The popular satire puppet show Spitting Image also parodied Kylie Minogue, depicting the Australian singer as being brought to life by a big headed scientist. Stock, Aitken and Waterman also appear as puppet heads with their bodies forming a tape machine with arms who sing along with a SAW-style song about how 'lucky' the singer has been. Comedians French and Saunders also parodied "I Should Be So Lucky" in their television show in 1990 where the song features as an opera.

In later years, Kylie Minogue became one of SAW's biggest artists. Her first 13 singles reached the UK top ten and her debut "I Should Be So Lucky" spent five weeks at number one in the UK. The album Kylie was the highest selling album in Britain of 1988, and fifth highest-selling album of the decade. They were also responsible for 1987's highest-selling single, Rick Astley's "Never Gonna Give You Up". At the height of their fame, SAW also had a top twenty hit as themselves with the largely instrumental "Roadblock" (from which M/A/R/R/S would lift the offending sample for "Pump Up the Volume").

In 1989, SAW wrote and produced the highest-selling album of the year, Jason Donovan's Ten Good Reasons. Donovan had been Minogue's co-star in Neighbours, and his success for a time equalled hers. In 1988–89, SAW recorded three tracks with Judas Priest, a cover and their own tracks "I Will Return" and "Runaround". These tracks were never released, and are said to be in Judas Priest's possession. Pete Waterman also owns a copy of the recording, commenting to Drowned in Music: "I occasionally dig the record out and play it to people, and they're amazed that we made heavy metal." and also "They're probably the best tracks we ever did, but quite rightly their manager said no." In 2015, a snippet of their cover version of The Stylistics hit "You Are Everything" was posted on the hard rock news site Blabbermouth.net

In 1989, SAW also recorded and produced Donna Summer's Another Place and Time album, as well as writing or co-writing all the tracks including the hit "This Time I Know It's for Real". Summer, a legendary American disco and pop singer, hired SAW in order to revive her career, just as an earlier European pop music producer (Giorgio Moroder) had launched it. However, a followup to Another Place and Time was never to be realized, reportedly due to difficult contract negotiations between Summer and SAW.

Another of SAW's most successful hit singles was the 1989 number-one single "Ferry Cross the Mersey" (a charity single featuring The Christians, Holly Johnson, Paul McCartney and Gerry Marsden). They also produced the 1989 edition of "Do They Know It's Christmas?"

1990–1993
Being the top producers in 1989, with seven number one singles, SAW started the 1990s with high hopes. February 1990 brought their last UK No.1 single, Kylie Minogue's cover of "Tears on My Pillow", and a top 10 hit with new recruit Lonnie Gordon, "Happenin' All Over Again" which hit No.4. However, by mid-1990 SAW artists were having problems placing singles in the top 10 (with the notable exception of Kylie Minogue), and the week of 13 October 1990 became the first with no SAW-produced singles in the UK top 75 in over two years. In mid-1991, Matt Aitken left the team due to stress, and Stock and Waterman carried on. With their sound no longer in vogue, they still had notable hits with Jason Donovan (who left them in 1991) and Kylie Minogue (who left them in 1992). 1993 saw a slight resurgence with two top 10 hits from Sybil, and top 40 hits from Bananarama, Bill Tarmey and the WWF Superstars. They also had a top 20 hit that year in the U.S. market with American female group Boy Krazy. In late 1993, Mike Stock ended his partnership with Waterman following a disagreement over their finances.

Recent times
In 1994, Stock and Aitken began working together again, forming Love This Records and achieving some success in the UK during the 1990s (notably with Robson & Jerome and Nicki French), while Waterman kept running PWL Records.

In 2005, the three producers reunited again and released a CD+DVD album, Stock Aitken Waterman Gold, with some of their best known singles. Despite their reunion, Aitken soon left. 2007 saw the release of a new Stock/Waterman produced single, the first in 14 years. It was The Sheilas' single "(I'm So) Happy Happy (You're Mine)", which reached No. 91 in the UK.

A reunion concert event called Hit Factory Live, was scheduled to place in Hyde Park, London in July 2012 featuring many of the acts associated with Pete Waterman's record labels but was cancelled due to safety concerns caused by the ongoing heavy rain during that summer. The rescheduled concert took place on 21 December 2012 at London's O2 Arena.

Following on from the cancelled summer event, Cheer Up, a night dedicated to the music of Stock Aitken Waterman was created by partygoers who had arrived at London that July meeting up in a bar near to the venue's grounds. The event, which has played in London, Manchester, Liverpool, Brighton, Newcastle, and Birmingham, has featured Sinitta, Sonia, Hazell Dean, Lonnie Gordon, Nathan Moore, Scooch, Nicki French, and Chloe Rose.

In December 2015, Stock, Aitken and Waterman made a return as a trio to their Hit Factory roots, producing a remix of the Chris Martin-written Kylie Minogue song "Every Day's Like Christmas".

Eurovision Song Contest
One of Stock Aitken Waterman's first collaborations was the Cypriot entry for the Eurovision Song Contest 1984, "Anna Maria Lena", performed by Andy Paul. The song finished 15th, with 31 points.

Stock and Waterman collaborated on the UK Eurovision 2010 entry "That Sounds Good to Me". It was revealed in the final round of Eurovision: Your Country Needs You on BBC One, in which Josh Dubovie eventually earned the right to perform the song at the contest. He finished in 25th in the Eurovision Song Contest 2010, receiving 10 points in total.

UK number-one hits
The following SAW produced hits made it to the top of the UK singles chart:
 1985: "You Spin Me Round (Like a Record)", Dead or Alive
 1987: "Respectable", Mel and Kim
 1987: "Let It Be", Ferry Aid, a cover of the 1970 Beatles' hit and charity single to raise money for the Zeebrugge Disaster Fund
 1987: "Never Gonna Give You Up", Rick Astley (also hit No. 1 in the U.S.)
 1987: "I Should Be So Lucky", Kylie Minogue
 1988: "Especially for You", Kylie Minogue and Jason Donovan
 1989: "Too Many Broken Hearts", Jason Donovan
 1989: "Hand on Your Heart", Kylie Minogue
 1989: "Ferry Cross the Mersey", Christians, Holly Johnson, Paul McCartney, Gerry Marsden and SAW, a cover of the Gerry and the Pacemakers' 1964 hit and charity single for victims of the Hillsborough disaster.
 1989: "Sealed with a Kiss", Jason Donovan, a cover of the Brian Hyland single
 1989: "You'll Never Stop Me Loving You", Sonia
 1989: "Do They Know It's Christmas", Band Aid II charity single
 1990: "Tears on My Pillow", Kylie Minogue's cover of the 1958 song by Little Anthony and the Imperials

US number-one hits
The following SAW produced hits made it to the top of the US pop chart:
 1986: "Venus", Bananarama (UK #8)
 1988: "Never Gonna Give You Up", Rick Astley (UK #1 in 1987)
 1988: "Together Forever", Rick Astley (UK #2)

See also
 List of songs produced by Stock Aitken Waterman 
 The Hit Factory: The Best of Stock Aitken Waterman (1987 UK compilation album released by Stylus Records)
 The Hit Factory Volume 2 (1988 UK/Japan compilation album released by Fanfare Records and PWL)
 The Hit Factory Volume 3 (1989 compilation album released by Fanfare Records and PWL)
 A Ton of Hits: The Very Best of Stock Aitken Waterman (1990 compilation released on Chrysalis Records' Dover Records sub-label)
 The Hit Factory: Pete Waterman's Greatest Hits (2000 compilation issued by Universal)
 Stock Aitken Waterman Gold (2005 compilation released by PWL in association with Sony BMG)
 Pete Waterman Presents The Hit Factory (2012 compilation released by Sony Music)

References

Further reading
 Harding, Phil. PWL From The Factory Floor, Cherry Red Books, 2011.
 Waterman, Pete. I Wish I Was Me, Virgin Books, 2000.
 Stock, Mike. The Hit Factory, New Holland Publishers, 2004.

External links
 Stock Aitken Waterman Official Site
 Mike Stock Official Site
 PWL / Pete Waterman Official Site
 Phil Harding Official Site

English record producers
English dance music groups
English pop musicians
Dance-pop groups
British hi-NRG musicians
Eurobeat musicians
British record production teams
British songwriting teams
Record production trios
Brit Award winners
Eurobeat